Bracken Ridge State High School (BRSHS) is a secondary school located in Bracken Ridge, Brisbane, Queensland, Australia. Its motto is "Strive to Accomplish". It educates grade levels seven to twelve. This school was previously known as Nashville State High School. It changed its name on 25 September 2000.

References

Public high schools in Brisbane
2000 establishments in Australia
Educational institutions established in 2000